The Cool Stuff Collective is a British children's television programme, which was produced for three series that aired on the ITV Network and CITV respectively from 13 September 2010 to 24 December 2011. The show featured reviews of the latest and forthcoming video games, gadgets, films and music. CITV also broadcast a similar format programme called "Play The Game" in 2004. Sy Thomas presented the programme for the majority of its run, with Vicky Letch and The Blowfish later taking over for the final series.

Presenters
Sy Thomas (2010–11)
Vicky Letch (2011)
Tom "The Blowfish" Hird (2011)

Controversy
In 2011, the programme was found to have breached Ofcom's rules on product placement. Ofcom stated that many of the items featured on the show ended with "overt encouragements" to consider purchase of the product.

Series Guide

References 

2010 British television series debuts
ITV children's television shows
Science and technology in the United Kingdom
Technology in society
2011 British television series endings